Zygolaelaps is a genus of mites in the family Laelapidae.

Species
 Zygolaelaps madagascariensis V. J. Tipton, 1957

References

Laelapidae